Rahmaniyeh (also Romanized as Raḩmānīyeh; also known as Raḩīmīyeh and Raḩmā’īyeh) is a village in Mosharrahat Rural District, in the Central District of Ahvaz County, Khuzestan Province, Iran. At the 2006 census, its population was 111, in 21 families.

References 

Populated places in Ahvaz County